Langon may refer to:
 Langon, Gironde, a commune in the Gironde department, France
 Langon, Ille-et-Vilaine, a commune in the Ille-et-Vilaine department, France
 Langon, Loir-et-Cher, a commune in the Loir-et-Cher department, France
 Långön, an island in the Luleå archipelago in the Swedish part of the Bothnian Bay
 Le Langon
 Arrondissement of Langon

Other uses
 Langon (grape), another name for the wine grape Merlot
 Fargues de Langon